Sammes is a surname. Notable people with the surname include:

 Mike Sammes (1928–2001), English musician and vocal session arranger
 William Sammes (politician), Mayor of Lincoln from 1515–1516
 William Sammes (judge), English judge from 1643–1646

See also
 Sammer